Sports Car Market is a magazine based in Portland, Oregon that covers the auctions of vehicles and other aspects of car collecting.

History and profile
Keith Martin started the magazine, originally called the Alfa Romeo Market Letter, in 1988.  The newsletter expanded to become the Sports Car Market Letter in 1993. Martin also published the magazine.

References

External links
Official web site

1988 establishments in Oregon
Automobile magazines published in the United States
Monthly magazines published in the United States
Magazines established in 1988
Magazines published in Portland, Oregon
Newsletters